A pocket is a bag- or envelope-like receptacle, most commonly in clothing.

Pocket or The Pocket may also refer to:

Other common meanings
 Pocket, a feature of some types of billiards table
 Passing pocket, a playing area in American and Canadian football
 Pocket (military), a term for when military units are cut off and surrounded by the enemy

Places
 The Pocket, New South Wales, Australia, a village
 The Pocket, an area in the neighbourhood of Riverdale, Toronto, Canada
 Pocket, Virginia, an unincorporated community in the United States
 Pocket Creek, a stream in Georgia, United States
 The Pocket – Floyd County, Georgia, United States, a recreational area
 Pocket-Greenhaven, Sacramento, California, a neighborhood also called "The Pocket"

Businesses
 Pocket Bicycles, a manufacturer of portable bicycles located in Massachusetts in the 1970s
 Pocket Books, a publisher of small paperback books, a division of Simon & Schuster
 Pocket Communications, a former regional cellular phone company in South Texas

Music
 Pocket (musician) a remixer and producer
 Pockets, a soul group from Baltimore
 The Pockets, the original name for the band Saga
 Pockets (album) by Karate
 "Pocket" (Ai Otsuka song), 2007
 "Pocket" (Sam Sparro song), 2008

Video game consoles
 Bemani Pocket, a series of video game consoles from Konami 
 Pelican VG Pocket, an early handheld video game console
 Analogue Pocket, a handheld game console

Other uses
 Pocket (service), management tool for keeping articles for reading later
 Herbert Pocket, a character in the novel Great Expectations by Charles Dickens
 Pocket Magazine, a defunct American literary magazine established in 1895
 Pocket Athletic Conference, a high school athletic conference in Indiana, United States
 Pocket pet, a small furry household pet